The 1990 United States Senate election in West Virginia was held on November 6, 1990. Incumbent Democratic U.S. Senator Jay Rockefeller won re-election to a second term.

Major candidates

Democratic 
 Jay Rockefeller, incumbent U.S. Senator

Republican 
 John C. Yoder, former Kansas District Court judge, former U.S. Supreme Court fellow

Results

See also 
 1990 United States Senate elections

References 

United States Senate
West Virginia
1990